George Pennington may refer to:

 Kewpie Pennington (1896–1953), Major League Baseball pitcher
 George Pennington (cricketer) (1899–1933), English cricketer